The Eurovision Song Contest 1971 was the 16th edition of the annual Eurovision Song Contest. Organised by the European Broadcasting Union (EBU) and host broadcaster  (RTÉ), the contest was held at the Gaiety Theatre on 3 April 1971, and was hosted by Irish television presenter Bernadette Ní Ghallchóir.

Eighteen countries participated in the contest, equalling the record of the 1965 and 1966 editions. Austria returned after their two-year absence, while Finland, Norway, Portugal and Sweden all returned after having boycotted the competition the previous year. On the other hand, Malta competed for the first time.

The winner was Monaco with the song "Un banc, un arbre, une rue", performed by Séverine, written by Yves Dessca, and composed by Jean-Pierre Bourtayre. This was Monaco's first and only victory in the contest. The song was performed by a French singer, living in France, sung in French, conducted by a French native and written by a French team. Séverine later claimed she never visited Monaco before or after her victory – a claim easily disproved by the preview video submitted by Télé-Monte-Carlo featuring the singer on location in the Principality. This was also the only time in the contest's history, where the second and third-placed entrants were also awarded.

Location 

The contest was held at the Gaiety Theatre in Dublin, the capital and most populous city of Ireland. This was the first time that the contest was held in Ireland. The Gaiety Theatre was selected as the venue for the 1971 contest as it was celebrating 100 years since its establishment in 1871.

Format 
For the first time, each participating broadcaster was required to televise all the songs in "previews" prior to the live final. Belgium's preview video featured Nicole and Hugo performing the song "Goeiemorgen, morgen", but Nicole was struck with a sudden illness days before the contest final, with Jacques Raymond and Lily Castel stepping in at short notice to perform the entry in their place. Reports suggested that Castel had not even had enough time to buy a suitable dress for the show.

The BBC were worried about the possible audience reaction to the UK song due to the hostilities raging in Northern Ireland. They specifically selected a singer from Northern Ireland, Clodagh Rodgers, who was popular in both the UK and the Republic of Ireland, to ease any ill-feeling from the Dublin audience. However, Rodgers still received death threats from the IRA for representing the UK.

Groups of up to six people were allowed to perform for the first time, with the rule in previous contests of performing either solo or as a duet abolished.

This was only RTÉ's second outside broadcast in colour. The contest was broadcast in Iceland, the United States and Hong Kong several days later.

In between each song, a film depicting the tourist highlights of each nation using stock footage provided by the participant tourism bureaus was seen, accompanied by a piece of organ music chosen to complement the country.

Voting system 
A new voting system was introduced in this year's contest: each country sent two jury members, one aged over 25 and the other under 25 (with at least ten years' difference between their ages), with both awarding each country (except their own) a score of between one and five points.

While this meant that no country could score fewer than 34 points (and in the event all eighteen scored at least 52), it had one major problem: some jury members tended to award only one or two points. Whether this was done to increase their respective countries' chances of winning is not known for sure, but this shortcoming was nonetheless plain. However, the system remained in place for the 1972 and 1973 contests.

Participating countries 

Malta made their début in this year's contest, while Austria, Finland, Norway, Portugal and Sweden all returned after a brief absence. This brought the total number of countries to eighteen.

Conductors 
Each performance had a conductor who directed the orchestra. This marked the first contest to feature someone other than the musical director conducting the host country's entry; Noel Kelehan conducted Ireland's entry instead of musical director Colman Pearce (who would subsequently conduct the Irish entries between 1972 and 1975).

 
 Anthony Chircop
 Jean-Claude Petit
 Hardy Schneiders
 
 Waldo de los Ríos
 Franck Pourcel
 
 Johnny Arthey
 Francis Bay
 
 
 Noel Kelehan
 Dolf van der Linden
 
 Miljenko Prohaska
 Ossi Runne
 Arne Bendiksen

Returning artists

Participants and results 

This is the only time in the contest's history where the second and third placing entrants were also awarded.

Detailed voting results

10 points 
Below is a summary of all perfect 10 scores that were given during the voting.

Jury members 

Listed below is the order in which votes were cast during the 1971 contest along with the names of the two jury members who voted for their respective country. Each country announced their results in groups of three.

 Beatrix Neundlinger and Jochen Lieben
 Gaetan Abela and Spiro Sillato
 Unknown
 Unknown
 Kirsten Ludwig and Wolfgang Henk
 Noelia Afonso and Francisco Madariaga
 Claude Crémieux and Jacques Ourevitch
 Mady Heinen and Michel Klein
 Jeremy Paterson Fox and Gay Lowe
 Unknown
 Unknown
 Eva Blomqvist and Putte Wickman
 Vivienne Colgan and Ken Steward
 Jos Cleber and Unknown
 Pedro Albergaria and Luís Filipe Costa
 Mišo Kukić and Zoran Kržišnik
 Markku Veijalainen and Vieno Kekkonen
 Sten Fredriksen and Liv Usterud

Broadcasts 

Each participating broadcaster was required to relay the contest via its networks. Non-participating EBU member broadcasters were also able to relay the contest as "passive participants". Broadcasters were able to send commentators to provide coverage of the contest in their own native language and to relay information about the artists and songs to their television viewers.

Known details on the broadcasts in each country, including the specific broadcasting stations and commentators are shown in the tables below. In addition to the participating countries, the contest was also reportedly broadcast in Greece, Iceland, Morocco and Tunisia, in Bulgaria, Czechoslovakia, Hungary, Poland and Romania via Intervision, and in Argentina, Australia, Brazil, Ethiopia, Hong Kong, Jamaica, Kenya, Mauritania, Mauritius, Sierra Leone, Thailand, Trinidad and Tobago, Uganda and the United States.

Notes

References

Bibliography 
The Eurovision Song Contest: The Official History, John Kennedy O'Connor, Carlton Books Ltd,

External links 

 
1971
Music festivals in Ireland
1971 in Ireland
1971 in Irish music
1971 in Irish television
1971 in radio
1971 music festivals
1970s in Dublin (city)
April 1971 events in Europe
Events in Dublin (city)